Clarissa is a city in Todd County, Minnesota, United States. The population was 681 at the 2010 census.

History
Clarissa was platted in 1877, and named for Clarissa Bischoffsheim, the wife of the founder. A post office has been in operation at Clarissa since 1880. Clarissa was incorporated in 1897.

Geography

Demographics

2010 census
As of the census of 2010, there were 681 people, 291 households, and 160 families living in the city. The racial makeup of the city was 98.2% White, 0.4% African American, 0.1% Asian, and 1.2% from two or more races. Hispanic or Latino of any race were 0.7% of the population.

There were 291 households, of which 21.3% had children under the age of 18 living with them, 46.0% were married couples living together, 5.8% had a female householder with no husband present, 3.1% had a male householder with no wife present, and 45.0% were non-families. 42.6% of all households were made up of individuals, and 22.6% had someone living alone who was 65 years of age or older. The average household size was 2.07 and the average family size was 2.84.

The median age in the city was 50.1 years. 19.8% of residents were under the age of 18; 5.9% were between the ages of 18 and 24; 19.4% were from 25 to 44; 24.7% were from 45 to 64; and 30.2% were 65 years of age or older. The gender makeup of the city was 48.3% male and 51.7% female.

2000 census
As of the census of 2000, there were 609 people, 256 households, and 142 families living in the city. The racial makeup of the city was 98.03% White, 0.16% African American, 0.49% Native American, 0.49% Asian, and 0.82% from two or more races. Hispanic or Latino of any race were 0.99% of the population.

There were 256 households, out of which 19.9% had children under the age of 18 living with them, 46.1% were married couples living together, 6.6% had a female householder with no husband present, and 44.5% were non-families. 40.6% of all households were made up of individuals, and 27.3% had someone living alone who was 65 years of age or older.  The average household size was 2.04 and the average family size was 2.77.

In the city, the population was spread out, with 17.1% under the age of 18, 6.1% from 18 to 24, 17.9% from 25 to 44, 21.8% from 45 to 64, and 37.1% who were 65 years of age or older.  The median age was 52 years. For every 100 females, there were 76.0 males.  For every 100 females age 18 and over, there were 70.0 males.

The median income for a household in the city was $25,125, and the median income for a family was $38,553. Males had a median income of $27,500 versus $17,000 for females. The per capita income for the city was $14,913.  About 3.6% of families and 8.3% of the population were below the poverty line, including 4.9% of those under age 18 and 9.7% of those age 65 or over.

References

Cities in Minnesota
Cities in Todd County, Minnesota